My Place may refer to:

Music
 My Place (album), by Monika Borzym, or the title song, 2013
 "My Place" (song), by Nelly, 2004
 "My Place", a song by the Crystals, 1965
 "My Place", a song by Diana Ross from Everything Is Everything, 1970
 "My Place", a song by T-Pain from Rappa Ternt Sanga, 2005
 "My Place", a song by Tweet from Southern Hummingbird, 2002
 "My Place", a song by the Vamps from Night & Day, 2017
 "My Place (Evergreen)", a song by Aqua Timez, 2007

Other uses
 My Place (book), a 1987 autobiography by Sally Morgan
 My Place (TV series), a 2009–2011 Australian children's series, based on Wheatley's book
 My Place, a 1987 children's picture book by Nadia Wheatley

See also
 "In My Place", a 2002 song by Coldplay